The men's 60 metres hurdles at the 2012 IAAF World Indoor Championships was held at the Ataköy Athletics Arena on 10 and 11 March.

Medalists

Records

Qualification standards

Schedule

Results

Heats
Qualification: First 3 of each heat (Q) plus 4 fastest times (q) qualified

Semifinals
Qualification: First 4 of each heat (Q) qualified.

Final
The final began at 17:21.

References

60 metres Hurdles
60 metres hurdles at the World Athletics Indoor Championships